Scutellarin is a flavone, a type of phenolic chemical compound. It can be found in the plants Scutellaria barbata and S. lateriflora which have been used in traditional medicine. The determination of the structure of scutellarin took Guido Goldschmiedt many years: after the first publication on that topic in 1901, only in 1910 he managed to obtain enough starting material for more detailed studies.

Scutellarin has been shown to induce apoptosis of ovarian and breast tumor cells in vitro. Scutellarin also shows protective effects for nerve cells that are affected by estrogen.

Scutellarin has been shown as a potential treatment for diabetic retinopathy, which could prevent diabetic blindness. In laboratory studies, scutellarin inhibits hypoxia-induced and moderately high glucose-induced proliferation and vascular endothelial growth factor (VEGF) expression in human retinal endothelial cells; thus, it could be a potential therapy for diabetic retinopathy. However, how scutellarin inhibits VEGF is unknown.

Scutellarin has anti-HIV-1 effects as well. In laboratory studies, a drug-resistant type HIV-1 cell-to-cell infection was inhibited with significant potency. The scutellarin compound was found to inhibit several strains of HIV-1 replication with different potencies, by preventing HIV-1 particle attachment and cell fusion, as well as inhibiting HIV-1 retransmission.

References 

Flavone glycosides
Flavonoid glucuronides
Glucuronide esters